Joe Goddard may refer to:

 Joe Goddard (musician) (born 1979), member of English band Hot Chip
 Joe Goddard (athlete) (1933–2019), Trinidadian Olympic sprinter
 Joe Goddard (boxer) (1857–1903), Australian boxer
 Joe Goddard (baseball) (born 1950), former Major League Baseball catcher